In Turkic mythology, Chesma İyasi (Turkish: Çeşme İyesi or Bulak İyesi or Pınar İyesi) was a cat-shaped spirit who lurked in wells or fountains and tempted youths to their deaths. As a female spirit that resides in water, she can be seen as a type of naiad.

Chesma İyasi were seen as dangerous due to their jealous tendencies. They were said to assume many different shapes, including that of a human, fish or fairy. Their usual form is that of a beautiful woman with the tail of a fish. When they are in human form, they can be recognised by the wet hem of their clothes.

Kuyu İyesi is a type of Çeşme İyesi. Unlike the Çeşme İyesi, they are benevolent spirits who protect the wells in which they make their homes.

See also
Mermaid
Nymph
List of Turkic mythological figures

References

External links
  Tatar Mitolojisinde Varlıklar, Çulpan Zaripova (Çeşme İyesi)

Female legendary creatures 
İye